Toms, Tom's or TOMS may refer to:

People
 Billy Toms (1895–unknown), Irish footballer
 Carl Toms (1927–1999), British set and costume designer
 David Toms (born 1967), American golfer on the PGA tour
 Edward Toms (1899–1971), British athlete
 Elaine Toms (disambiguation), multiple people
Elaine G. Toms, Canadian and British information scientist
M. Elaine Toms (1917–2019), Korean-born American physicist
 Eric Toms (born 1979), American comedian
 Frederick Toms (1885–unknown), Canadian rower
 Ivan Toms (1953–2008), South African physician and political activist
 Jeff Toms (born 1974), Canadian ice hockey player
 Kevin Toms, computer game designer
 Peter Toms (painter) (c. 1728-1777), English portrait and drapery painter
 Samuel Toms (c. 1842–1907), founder of Good, Toms & Co, South Australian wholesaler
 Wendy Toms (born 1962), English football referee
 William Henry Toms (c. 1700–1765), English engraver
 Toms Hartmanis (born 1987), Latvian ice hockey player
 Toms (cartoonist) (1929–2016), Indian cartoonist V. T. Thomas

Geography
 Toms River, New Jersey, United States, an estuary
 Toms Lake, Michigan, United States

Businesses
 TOM'S, Tachi Oiwa Motor Sport, a Japanese racing team and engine tuner
 Tom's Hardware, an online publication focused on technology
 Tom's Ice Cream Bowl, an ice cream parlor in Zanesville, Ohio, United States
 Toms International, a European confectionery maker
 Tom's Kitchen, a restaurant in Chelsea, England
 Tom's of Maine, a manufacturer of personal care products
 Tom's Restaurant, Manhattan, New York, United States
 TOMS Shoes, a manufacturer of shoes and glasses
 Tom's Snacks Co., a manufacturer of snack foods

Other uses
 Total Ozone Mapping Spectrometer (TOMS)
 ACM Transactions on Mathematical Software
 Short name for tom drum

See also
 
 Tom (disambiguation)
 Toms River (disambiguation)